Alican may refer to:

Given name
 Alican Güney (born 1989), Turkish basketball player 
 Alican Karataş, Turkish curler
 Alican Kaynar (born 1988), Turkish yacht racer

Surname
 Ekrem Alican (1916-2000), Turkish politician

Places
 Alıcan (also, Alydzhan and Alyjan), a village in the Lachin Rayon of Azerbaijan

Other uses
 , Turkish powership

Turkish masculine given names